Malvina is an unincorporated community located in Bolivar County, Mississippi, United States, located approximately  northwest of Symonds and approximately  east of Rosedale.

Originally named "Phalia", the town was established in 1887 by Jett Dent, who became the first postmaster.  Dent owned a logging company and sawmill, as well as a flat boat with which he plied the waters of the Bogue Phalia, which ran through Phalia.

Phalia was a busy logging town, and the Bogue Phalia was used to run log rafts south to Pace to be milled.

When the Louisville, New Orleans and Texas Railway built a line in the late 1880s between Rosedale and Boyle, a depot, platforms, water tank and wood yard were constructed at Phalia.  By 1900, there was a store, two seed houses, and a train that ran twice daily.

In 1901, the town's name was changed to Malvina, after Malvina Yeager Scott.

A post office operated under the name Phalia from 1887 to 1901 and under the name Malvina from 1901 to 1956.

A dirt road ran from Rosedale to Merigold, and passed through Malvina. In 1906, the Board of Supervisors began county-wide gravel road construction.

In the 1920s, a wooden three-way bridge was built in Malvina over the confluence of the Lane Bayou and Bogue Phalia. It was one of the few three-way bridges in the world, and was torn down and replaced by a modern bridge in 1972.

References

Unincorporated communities in Bolivar County, Mississippi
Unincorporated communities in Mississippi